La Thành is the Vietnamese form of the Chinese placename Luocheng     formerly romanized as Lo-ch’eng.

It may refer to:

 Long Biên (Chinese: Longbian), within present-day Hanoi
 Tống Bình (Chinese: Songping), within present-day Hanoi
 Thăng Long, Hanoi proper, particularly
 Đại La, the old fortress around which the city grew up
 Other Luochengs within China